The 1952 Tipperary Senior Hurling Championship was the 62nd staging of the Tipperary Senior Hurling Championship since its establishment by the Tipperary County Board in 1887. The championship began on 24 August 1952 and ended on 14 September 1952.

Holycross-Ballycahill were the defending champions.

On 14 September 1952, Thurles Sarsfields won the championship after a 5-06 to 1-08 defeat of Borris-Ileigh in the final at Nenagh Park. It was their 17th championship title overall and their first title since 1946.

Qualification

Results

Semi-finals

Final

References

Tipperary
Tipperary Senior Hurling Championship